Pterostoma palpina, the pale prominent, is a moth from the family Notodontidae. The species was first described by Carl Alexander Clerck in 1759.

Distribution
The moth can be found in Europe and Central Asia (Palearctic realm).

Description
Pterostoma palpina has a wingspan of 35 to 52 mm. Beyond the black scaled tooth-like forewing projection the inner margin is notched. Long labial palps and tufts on the tail segment, give an elongated appearance. The antennae of the female are pectinated, but the teeth are shorter than those of the male; and the blackish streak on the wings are usually less defined. Except that some specimens are more strongly marked than others there is little variation. The larva is bluish green, with white dorsal and lateral lines, and a black edged yellow stripe along the spiracles; this stripe is marked with reddish on the three anterior segments.

Biology
The moth survives winter as a pupa. The imago looks like a piece of wood and the flying period ranges from the start of April to the start of September.
  The flight season refers to the British Isles. This may vary in other parts of the range.

Host plants
The host plants are willows and poplar.

References

Further reading
 South R. (1907) The Moths of the British Isles, (First Series), Frederick Warne & Co. Ltd., London & NY: 359 pp. online

External links

Pale Prominent at UKMoths
Moths and Butterflies of Europe and North Africa
Fauna Europaea
Lepiforum e.V.
Portal für Schmetterlinge und Raupen

Notodontidae
Moths described in 1759
Moths of Asia
Moths of Europe
Taxa named by Carl Alexander Clerck